Carmine Cardamone (born September 23, 1950) is a former member of the Arizona House of Representatives. He served in the House from January 1997 through January 2003, serving district 11.

References

Democratic Party members of the Arizona House of Representatives
1950 births
Living people